Rajopadhyaya (Nepali: राजोपाध्याय) is one of Newar Bramhans in Nepal.

In Sanskrit, Rājopādhyāya or Rāj-Upādhyāya literally means 'royal teacher' or 'guru' (Sanskrit: राज = royal + उपाध्याय = guru). Rajopadhyayas, also colloquially called Deva Brāhman (God-Brahmin) or Dyabājyā (God-Grandfather) or Barmu (Brahmin) were the royal gurus and purohits of the Malla kings and their Hindu aristocracy (present day Chatharīyās). Today, the Rajopadhyaya Brahmans are the domestic priests of the high-caste Hindu Newars, principally the Chatharīyas and Śreşțhas, and also certain segments of clean-caste Hindu Newar groups (most notably Bhaktapur Jyapus) of the Kathmandu Valley. In theory, the Chatharīyas of the Kathmandu Valley do not call on other Brahmin group, as Rajopadhyayas alone serve as their historical purohits and perform all their life-cycle Sanskara rituals, including attaining their Gayatri Mantra verse and the sacred thread ('janai') in the Upanayana ceremony. This is opposed to all other clean-caste Newar groups who call upon a Buddhist Vajrāchārya as their family priest to conduct all life-cycle ceremonies.

Rajopadhyayas are an endogamous Brahman group who are the descendants of Kānyakubja Brahmins of Kannauj who immigrated to Kathmandu Valley as late as the 16th century CE. They are divided among the three cities of Kathmandu, Bhaktapur and Lalitpur into strictly exogamous clans, having three gotras: Gārgya of Lalitpur, Bharadwaja of Bhaktapur, and Kaushik of Kathmandu, all belonging to the Mādhyamdina school of the Shukla Yajurveda, their holy language being Sanskrit, but all well-versed in Newar. As the chief Brahmin group among Newars and as the chief preceptor of the Vedic as well as Tantric knowledge, Rajopadhyayas were placed at top in Nepalese Caste System, and they possess immense social prestige and power, especially among the Hindu Newars.

Priesthood 
Rajopadhyayas also serve as the Vedic and Tantric temple priests of some of the most important temples of the Vaishnav and Shaivite sect, including Krishna Mandir and the four cardinal Vishnu temples of Kathmandu Valley; Changu Narayan, Sesh Narayan/Budhanilkantha, Bishankhu Narayan, and Ichanghu Narayana, as well as the Kumbheshwar Temple. In most other major temples with explicit Shakta and Tantra functions which require blood sacrifice and the use of alcohol, Rajopadhyayas are absent, and the priestly functions are performed by the Chatharīyā/Kşatrīya-status Karmāchāryas. Most of the other Shakta or Ganesh shrines are maintained by the farmer Jyapus or by unclean-castes like the Jogi/Kapali or the untouchable Chyāmaha/Déula. The lone exception to the rule of Rajopadhayayas not being part of the Shakta cult is Bhaktapur's Taleju Bhawani temple, the ista-devi of Malla kings, where they serve as the chief priests. In addition to their duties as purohits to Chatharīyās and Śresțhas, Rajopadhyayas also serve as hereditary pujāris of the following temples:

 Changu Narayan (a UNESCO World Heritage site) in Bhaktapur
 Pasupatinath (another UNESCO World Heritage Site: Rajopadhyayas were the chief priest of the temple in the past in Kathmandu
 Taleju temples in Kathmandu, Bhaktapur and Lalitpur
 Dui Maju temple in Kathmandu and Bhaktapur 
 Kumbheshwor Mahadev in Lalitpur
 Nyatapola (Siddhilaxmi) Temple in Bhaktapur 
 Krishna Temple in Patan Durbar Square
 Sano Pashupati in Kathmandu Durbar Square
 Ichangu Narayan Temple in Halchowk
 Shesh Narayan in Farping
 Hanuman Agam temple in Kathmandu Durbar Square
 Laxmi Narayan temple in Changu Narayan complex

Maithil Brahmins 
There also exist a group of separate Brahmin among the Newar community who are called Maithil Brahmins with Jha and Mishra surnames. Unlike the Rajopadhyayas, the Maithil Brahmins are not considered as Newars or part of the Newar society by themselves as well as by others. Maithil Brahmins are most prominently the temple priests of the Mahalaxmi Temple, Char Narayan Temple, Jaisidega Temple, Batuk Bhairav, among others. Rajopadhayayas, demonstrating their Kanyakubja heritage, avoid matrimonial ties with the Maithil Brahmins and maintain their 'superior' status over the Maithil Brahmins.

Popular Rajopadhyaya Names 
Rajopadhyayas popularly use the following surnames: Rajopadhyaya, Sharma, Upadhyaya, Acharya, among others.
Some popular Rajopadhyaya names from history and popular culture include:
 Sudarshan Brahman (a mythical Brahmin to slain Changu Narayan)
 Gaya Juju (Gayo Bājé) of Sulimha, Patan  
 Vishvanath Upādhyāya of Valimha, Patan 
 Sahasra Shivānanda of Indrachowk 
 Pundit Vamshi Dharānanda Rajopadhyaya of Changu Narayan
 Newa Priest and scholar Basav Juju Rajopadhyay from Kathmandu  who is working to preserve and promote newa culture, ritual tradition around United States of America.

See also
 Bahun
 Nepalese caste system
 Newar caste system
 Shaivism
 Shakta
 Gotras

References 

7. https://english.onlinekhabar.com/basav-juju-rajopadhyay-newa-priest.html

External links 
 http://www.rajopadhyaya.info
 http://rajopadhyaya.blogspot.com
 https://books.google.com/books?ei=b5tCTs1ax9CtB8aDgdMH&ct=result&id=BHrXAAAAMAAJ&dq=rajopadhyaya+origin&q=rajopadhyaya#search_anchor
 https://books.google.com/books?id=lH0RAQAAIAAJ&q=rajopadhyaya+origin&dq=rajopadhyaya+origin&hl=en&ei=b5tCTs1ax9CtB8aDgdMH&sa=X&oi=book_result&ct=result&resnum=4&ved=0CDwQ6AEwAw

Caste system in Nepal

https://english.onlinekhabar.com/basav-juju-rajopadhyay-newa-priest.html